SCS is an acronym for "Sistema Cablaggio Semplificato" ("Simplified Cable Solution"). It uses a fieldbus network protocol and has applications in the field of home automation and building automation. It is used mainly in bTicino and Legrand installations.

General features
An SCS bus is based on a sheathed twisted pair formed of two flexible conductors; these are braided and unshielded with isolation 300/500V, SELV as double isolation is required – according to the rules adopted by CEI (International Electrotechnical Committee). The bus is unpolarized, devices are required to support the DC power supply in both polarity.

Wiring
Two kind of wiring are possible:
Free cabling were a mix of bus and star topology are present, better for old houses
Star wiring were all devices are connected to the switch rack, better for new houses

Communication
Across the SCS bus four different types of signals are transmitted in frequency modulation:
 Electricity supply via 27 Vdc
 Data with a frequency clock of 9600 Hz
 Sound
 Video
The transmission protocol is the CSMA/CA.

Functions
Through the SCS bus you have the following functions:
 Light control
 Automation
 Sound diffusion
 Energy management
 Thermoregulation
 Video intercom
 Alarm system
All the listed functions share the same technology and the same procedures for configuration / installation.

Configuration
All devices connected to SCS bus must be manually configured, no autolearn is possible, apart Alarm system and extenders. Configuration assign an address and an operating mode. Two kind of configurations are possible:
Physical - using numbered jumpers with different values resistor
Virtual - using a configuration software connected with an ethernet gateway. In this case the address and operating mode are written in a non volatile memory in every device. Applying a physical jumper override the virtual configuration wiping the memory.

Addressing details
Device addressing use three different 'digits' A|PL|GR. The A mean the room, the PL is the Point of Load in the room, and GR is the group. Group join loads in same or different rooms in a logical manner. Not all devices has group addressing. All devices must answer to room broadcast called AMB. All devices must answer to general broadcast called GEN. Physical and Virtual addressing has different limitations:

Writing physical addresses use 2 digits. Writing virtual addresses use 4 digits.
In big houses and buildings, SCS address extension is possible, were different address domains are connected via some bridges. Only some kind of messages can cross a bridge.
Here the values of physical configuration jumpers:

Note: It looks like the values of the configurators are measured, not from any official table. Resistor values are not between short difference. E.g. "4", it is in this table 471 kohm; if resistor is 1%, it is about 470 k ... 479 k. The original table from year 1999/2000 says: 0 = 4,7M, 1 = 825k, 2 = 681k, 3 = 562k, 4 = 475k, 5 = 392k, 6 = 332k, 7 = 274 k, 8 = 221k and 9 = 182k. All these values are found in the standard "E"-resistor value table (EIA E96) but not uniformly spaced (is that correct?). Resistor values in this list are official. However the table values above are useful because all the values fall inside the 1% resistor tolerance area specified by E96 (except value 3501/9 measured at 179k - a second example tested also gave a reading of 179k).

Certifications
Devices connected to the SCS bus are IMQ-certified and comply with these product standards (International Electrotechnical Commission (IEC) EN 50428 - IEC EN 60669-1/A1 - IEC EN 60669-2-1 - IEC EN 50090-2-2 - IEC EN 50090-2-3 ).

Integration
You can interact with the SCS bus through a gateway and an open high-level protocol called OpenWebNet. Two kind of gateway exist:
Gateway ethernet (Linux based)
Gateway USB / RS-232
These gateways are bidirectional; they translate SCS frames into OpenWebNet frames, and the other way round.
The open protocol OpenWebNet shared by MyOpen community, let everybody to build software that interact with SCS devices. SCS protocol is a proprietary bTicino protocol. Interaction with other field bus must happen only writing software that use OpenWebNet.

See also
 Home automation
 Building automation

Home automation
Building engineering